Martha S. Jones is an American historian and legal scholar. She is the Society of Black Alumni Presidential Professor and Professor of History at The Johns Hopkins University. She studies the legal and cultural history of the United States, with a particular focus on how Black Americans have shaped the history of American democracy. She has published books on the voting rights of African American women, the debates about women's rights among Black Americans in the early United States, and the development of birthright citizenship in the United States as promoted  by African Americans in Baltimore before the Civil War.

Early life and education
Jones attended Hunter College, where she graduated with a BA degree in 1984. She then attended the CUNY School of Law, earning a JD in 1987.

Legal career
From 1987 to 1994, Jones was a public interest lawyer with MFY Legal Services and the HIV Law Project. In 1994, she was awarded a Charles H. Revson Fellowship on the Future of the City of New York at Columbia University.

Academic career
Jones then became a graduate student at Columbia University, and obtained an MA in history in 1997, an MPhil in history in 1998, and a PhD in history in 2001. During her graduate studies, Jones was an adjunct lecturer at Eugene Lang College of Liberal Arts at The New School, and a visiting professor of history at Barnard College. In 2001, she joined the faculty of History and Afroamerican and African Studies at the University of Michigan, where she was an Arthur F. Thurnau Professor from 2013 to 2017, and a Presidential Bicentennial Professor from 2016 to 2017. From 2004 to 2017 she was also affiliated with the University of Michigan Law School.

In 2017 Jones joined the faculty at The Johns Hopkins University, becoming the Society of Black Alumni Presidential Professor and Professor of History.

Jones has held visiting positions, including at the School for Advanced Studies in the Social Sciences in Paris, and the University of Pennsylvania Law School. She has held fellowships from the American Council of Learned Societies, the National Humanities Center, Library Company of Philadelphia, and the National Constitution Center. She is a distinguished lecturer of the Organization of American Historians.

In 2018 Jones was elected a Fellow of the American Antiquarian Society. In 2017, she became a co-president of the Berkshire Conference of Women Historians, and serves on the board of governors for the William L. Clements Library.

Research
In 2007, Jones published All Bound Up Together: The Woman Question in African American Public Culture, 1830–1900. In it, she discusses the woman question in the debate over women's rights in African-American public culture during the early 1800s. Jones presents evidence that contradicts the dominant narrative that the women's rights movement in America began with the Seneca Falls Convention in 1848, instead showing that African-American women successfully contested the right to speak before a mixed-gender audience as early as the 1830s. Jones also discusses the backlash against these activists, and the trajectory of the following generations of activists up to 1900. She shows that the American Civil War provided black women the opportunity to expand their involvement in public service activities, such as teaching and charity work, and that despite the constraints of the Reconstruction era and Jim Crow laws, many black women were able to further their positions in social and religious institutions and thereby accrue public authority.

Jones authored Birthright Citizens: A History of Race and Rights in Antebellum America. The book relates how African-American activists transformed the terms of citizenship for all Americans. Before the Civil War, colonization schemes and black laws threatened to deport former slaves born in the United States. Birthright Citizens recovers the story of how African-American activists remade national belonging through battles in legislatures, conventions, and courthouses. They faced formidable opposition, most notoriously from the U.S. Supreme Court decision in Dred Scott v. Sandford. Yet no single case defined their status. Former slaves studied law, secured allies, and conducted themselves like citizens, establishing their status through local, everyday claims. All along they argued that birth guaranteed their rights. With fresh archival sources and a reframing of constitutional law-making before the Civil War, Jones shows how as the Fourteenth Amendment constitutionalized the birthright principle, black Americans' aspirations were realized. Birthright Citizens was winner of the Organization of American Historians Liberty Legacy Award for the best book in civil rights history, the American Historical Association's Littleton-Griswold Prize for the best book in American legal history, and the American Society for Legal History John Phillip Reid book award for the best book in Anglo-American legal history.

In 2020, Jones published Vanguard: How Black Women Broke Barriers, Won the Vote and Insisted on Equality for All. In the usual story, the suffrage crusade began in Seneca Falls in 1848 and ended with the ratification of the Nineteenth Amendment in 1920. But this overwhelmingly white women's movement did not win the vote for most black women. Securing their rights required a movement of their own. Jones offers a new history of African-American women's political lives in America. She recounts how they defied both racism and sexism to fight for the ballot, and how they wielded political power to secure the equality and dignity of all persons. From the earliest days of the republic to the passage of the Voting Rights Act of 1965 and beyond, Jones excavates the lives and work of black women who were the vanguard of women's rights.

Jones also co-edited the 2015 volume Toward an Intellectual History of Black Women.

Honors
 2013–14: National Humanities Center William C. and Ida Friday Fellow
 2019: American Society for Legal History John Phillip Reid Book Award
 2019: American Historical Association Littleton-Griswold Prize for Birthright Citizens
 2019: Organization of American Historians Liberty Legacy Foundation Award for Birthright Citizens
 2020: Los Angeles Times History Book Prize for Vanguard

Creative work
Jones is curator of museum exhibitions including "Reframing the Color Line" and "Proclaiming Emancipation" in conjunction with the William L. Clements Library.

Selected works
"'Make us a Power': African-American Methodists Debate the Rights of Women, 1870–1900" in Women and Religion in the African Diaspora] (2006)
"Leave of Court: African-American Legal Claims Making In the Era of Dred Scott v. Sandford" in Contested Democracy: Freedom, Race, and Power in American History (2007)
All Bound Up Together: The Woman Question in African American Public Culture, 1830–1900 (2007)
"Overthrowing the 'Monopoly of the Pulpit': Race and the Rights of Churchwomen in Nineteenth Century America" in No Permanent Waves: Recasting Histories of U.S. Feminism (2010)
"Time, Space, and Jurisdiction in Atlantic World Slavery: The Volunbrun Household in Gradual Emancipation New York". Law and History Review 29, no. 4 (2011)
"The Case of Jean Baptiste, un Créole de Saint-Domingue: Narrating Slavery, Freedom, and the Haitian Revolution in Baltimore City,” in The American South and the Atlantic World (2013)
"Emancipation’s Encounters: Seeing the Proclamation Through Soldiers’ Sketchbooks". Journal of the Civil War Era vol. 3, no. 4 (December 2013)
"History and Commemoration: The Emancipation Proclamation at 150". Journal of the Civil War Era, 3, no. 4 (December 2013)
Toward an Intellectual History of Black Women (2015)
"First the Streets, Then the Archives". American Journal of Legal History 56, no. 1 (March 2016)
"Forgetting the Abolition of the Slave Trade in the United States: How History Troubled Memory in 2008" in Distant Ripples of the British Abolitionist Wave: Africa, Asia, and the Americas (2017)
Birthright Citizens: A History of Race and Rights in Antebellum America (2018)
"How the Daughters and Granddaughters of Former Slaves Secured Voting Rights for All". Smithsonian Magazine (March 8, 2019)
Vanguard: How Black Women Broke Barriers, Won the Vote, and Insisted on Equality for All (2020)

References

External links

20th-century African-American women writers
20th-century African-American writers
20th-century American historians
20th-century American women writers
21st-century African-American women writers
21st-century African-American writers
21st-century American historians
21st-century American women writers
African-American academics
African-American legal scholars
American legal scholars
American women academics
American women social scientists
City University of New York alumni
Columbia University alumni
Eugene Lang College The New School for Liberal Arts faculty
Historians from New York (state)
Historians of African Americans
Historians of the United States
Hunter College alumni
Johns Hopkins University faculty
Living people
University of Michigan faculty
Year of birth missing (living people)